This is a list of newspapers published in Malta.

Defunct newspapers

References

Malta